William Relph (26 January 1900 – September 1978) was an English professional footballer who played in the Football League for Ashington and Brentford as a forward.

Career statistics

Honours 
Blyth Spartans

 Northumberland Aged Miners Homes Cup: 1919–20, 1920–21 (joint winners)

References

1900 births
English footballers
English Football League players
Brentford F.C. players
People from Morpeth, Northumberland
Footballers from Northumberland
Association football outside forwards
Blyth Spartans A.F.C. players
Ashington A.F.C. players
1978 deaths
Morpeth Town A.F.C. players

Association football inside forwards